Institute for Business Administration may refer to:

 Institute of Business Administration, Karachi , Pakistan
 Institute of Business Administration, University of Dhaka, Bangladesh
 Institute of Business Administration, Jahangirnagar University, Bangladesh
 Institute of Business Administration, University of Rajshahi, Bangladesh
 Institute of Business Administration, Sukkar, Sindh, Pakistan, not affiliated with IBA Karachi
Army Institute of Business Administration, Savar, Bangladesh